Osvaldo Oreste Guidi (born in Máximo Paz, Argentina on 10 March 1964 – died in Buenos Aires on 17 October 2011) was an Argentinian cinema, theater and television actor, and a dramaturge and theater director. He committed suicide by hanging.

He studied acting and theater pedagogy and for twenty years engaged in teaching in his Buenos Aires theater studio.  He appeared in many theater productions (as an actor, writer and director), films, and television series.

Filmography

Film 
1979: Contragolpe
1980: Canción de Buenos Aires
1982: Plata dulce
1998: Tango
2000: Apariencias
2000: Sin reserva
2004: Peligrosa obsesión

Television 
 1988: La bonita página
 1988: De carne somos
 1989: Rebelde
 1991: Chiquilina mía
 1991: Celeste
 1992: Antonella
 1993: Zona de riesgo
 1993: Casi todo casi nada
 1994: Milagros
 1994: Con alma de tango
 1994: Más allá del horizonte
 1995: Poliladron
 1998: Muñeca brava
 2000: Primicias
 2000: Amor latino
 2002: Infieles
 2003: Resistiré
 2003: Costumbres argentinas
 2004: La niñera
 2005: Amor mío
 2006: Se dice amor

Theater 
as playwright and director
 Ibseniana 
 Tango mortal
 Milonga de ángeles 
 Sexo necesidad maldita 
 Yepeto

as actor
 Feizbuk Stars
 Escoria
 Partes iguales
 Ibseniana 
 Cyrano de Bergerac
 Volpone y el zorro
 Scapino
 Tango mortal 
 Milonga de ángeles 
 Sexo necesidad maldita

References

Argentine theatre directors
Argentine dramatists and playwrights
Argentine male film actors
Argentine male stage actors
Argentine male television actors
People from Constitución Department
Suicides by hanging in Argentina
1964 births
2011 deaths
20th-century Argentine male actors
21st-century Argentine male actors
Dramaturges
20th-century dramatists and playwrights
2011 suicides